Asela or Asella may refer to:

 Asela, an Indian name for the cyprinid Schizothorax plagiostomus, often erroneously applied to the Common snowtrout (S. richardsonii)
 Asela of Sri Lanka, a Sinhalese king of the 2nd century BC
 Asella, a town in Ethiopia, west of Mount Chilalo
 Asella Airport, IATA airport code ALK